The Great Indian Peninsula Railway (reporting mark GIPR) was a predecessor of the Central Railway (and by extension, the current state-owned Indian Railways), whose headquarters was at the Boree Bunder in Mumbai (later, the Victoria Terminus and presently the Chhatrapati Shivaji Maharaj Terminus). The Great Indian Peninsula Railway Company was incorporated on 1 August 1849 by the Great Indian Peninsula Railway Company Act 1849 (12 & 13 Vict. c.83) of the Parliament of the United Kingdom. It had a share capital of 50,000 pounds. On 21 August 1847 it entered into a formal contract with the East India Company for the construction and operation of a railway line, 56 km long, to form part of a trunk line connecting Bombay with Khandesh and Berar and generally with the other presidencies of India. The Court of Directors of the East India Company appointed James John Berkeley as Chief Resident Engineer and Charles Buchanan Ker and Robert Wilfred Graham as his assistants. It was India's first passenger railway, the original 21 miles (33.8 km) section opening in 1853, between Bombay (Mumbai) and Tanna (Thane). On 1 July 1925 its management was taken over by the Government. On 5 November 1951 it was incorporated into the Central Railway.

Incorporation in London

It was originally meant to connect the towns of Poona (Pune), Nassuek (Nashik), Aurungabad (Aurangabad), Ahmednuggur (Ahmednagar), Sholapoor (Solapur), Nagpur, Akola (West Berar), Oomrawutty (Amravati), and Hyderabad. It was meant for the purpose of increasing the export of cotton, silk, opium, sugar and spices.

The management committee consisted of 25 British men, including officials of the East India Company and banks in London, most of whom resided in Britain and some who had resided in India. The original 25 person board consisted of people such as John Stuart-Wortley and William Hamilton (both MPs from Britain who became the company's chairman and deputy chairman), Frederick Ayrton (ex-East India Company), cavalrymen such as Major Clayton and Major-General Briggs, Bombay residents John Graham, Col. Dickenson, Hon. Jugonnath Sunkersett and Sir Jamsetjee Jejeebhoy, bankers such as John Harvey (Commercial Bank of London) and S. Jervis (Director of the London and County Bank, Lombard Street), and directors of other railway companies such as Richard Paterson (Chairman of the Northern and Eastern Railway Company) and Melvil Wilson (Director of the Alliance Assurance Office).

Railways around Bombay
On 16 April 1853 at 3:35 pm, the first passenger train of the Great Indian Peninsula Railway left Boree Bunder station in Bombay (present day Mumbai) for Tanna (present day Thane). The train took fifty-seven minutes to reach Tanna. It covered a distance of 21 miles (33.8 km). Three locomotives named Sultan, Sindh and Sahib pulled the 14 carriages carrying 400 passengers on board.

The portion of the line from Tanna to Callian (present day Kalyan) was opened on 1 May 1854. The construction of this portion was difficult as it involved two-line viaducts over the estuary (see picture on right) and two tunnels.

On 12 May 1856 the line was extended to Campoolie (present day Khopoli) via Padusdhurree (present day Palasdhari) and on 14 June 1858 Khandala-Poona (present day Pune) section was opened to traffic. The Padusdhurree-Khandala section involved the difficult crossing of the Bhore Ghat (present day Bhor Ghat) and it took another five years for completion. During this period, the 21 km gap was covered by palanquin, pony or cart through the village of Campoolie.

The Kassarah (present day Kasara) line was opened on 1 January 1861 and the steep Thull ghat (present day Thal Ghat) section up to Egutpoora (present day Igatpuri) was opened on 1 January 1865 and thus completed the crossing of the Sahyadri.

Bombay to Madras
Beyond Callian, the south-east main line proceeded over Bhor Ghat to Poona, Sholapore (present day Solapur) and Raichore (present day Raichur), where it joined the Madras Railway. By 1868, route kilometerage was 888 km and by 1870, route kilometerage was 2,388.

Bombay to Calcutta

Beyond Callian, the north-east main line proceeded over the Thull ghat to Bhosawal (present day Bhusawal). From Bhosawal, there was a bifurcation. One passed through great cotton districts of Akola (West Berar) and Oomravuttee (present day Amravati) and was extended up to Nagpore (present day Nagpur) and then to Raj-nandgaon in Drug district (Present day Durg). The other was extended up to Jubbulpore (present day Jabalpur) to connect with the Allahabad-Jubbulpore branch line of the East Indian Railway which had been opened in June 1867. Hence it became possible to travel directly from Bombay to Calcutta.

The Howrah-Allahabad-Mumbai line was officially opened on 7 March 1870 and it was part of the inspiration for French writer Jules Verne's book Around the World in Eighty Days. Although, in the novel it is erroneously claimed that the line passes through Aurangabad, which is, again erroneously claimed as the capital of the Emperor Aurangzeb Alamgeer. At that time period, line had not reached Aurangabad but rather moved northward after reaching Bhusawal towards Jabalpur. At the opening ceremony, the Viceroy Lord Mayo concluded that "it was thought desirable that, if possible, at the earliest possible moment, the whole country should be covered with a network of lines in a uniform system".

Rolling stock 
By the end of 1874 the company owned 345 steam locomotives, 1309 coaches and 7924 goods wagons. In 1906 a steam railcar from Kerr, Stuart and Company was purchased. By 1936, the rolling stock had increased to 835 locomotives, 1285 coaches and more than 20.000 freight wagons.

Classification
It was labeled as a Class I railway according to Indian Railway Classification System of 1926.

See also
 List of railway companies in India
 Nizam's Guaranteed State Railway

Notes

External links
 

Transport in Mumbai
Transport in Thane
Transport in Pune
Transport in Kalyan-Dombivli
Transport in Solapur
Transport in Bhusawal
Transport in Durg
Transport in Nagpur
Transport in Jabalpur
Transport in Amravati
Defunct railway companies of India
1849 establishments in British India
1951 disestablishments in India
Railway companies established in 1849
Railway companies disestablished in 1951
1951 mergers and acquisitions
Indian companies established in 1849